"Want to Want Me" is a song recorded by American singer Jason Derulo for his fourth studio album, Everything Is 4 (2015). It was released as the album's lead single on March 9, 2015. The song was written by Derulo, Sam Martin, Lindy Robbins, Mitch Allan, and its producer, Ian Kirkpatrick.

"Want to Want Me" peaked at number five on the Billboard Hot 100, becoming Derulo's sixth top ten hit in the United States. The song topped the UK Singles Chart with first-week sales of 127,000 units. It marked Derulo's fourth number-one single in the United Kingdom, following "In My Head" (2010), "Don't Wanna Go Home" (2011) and "Talk Dirty" (2013). "Want to Want Me" remained at number one in the UK for four weeks.

Background
Derulo said that the song was the first one recorded for his album Everything Is 4, and he decided to release it as the lead single after having several friends listen to it.

According to some news reports, Olly Murs was originally going to release the song instead of Jason Derulo, but was forced to reject it as his voice wasn't high enough to reach the high notes, and it was decided that Olly Murs would be replaced by Jason Derulo as the singer of the song. Olly later admitted to regretting turning it down after seeing how popular of a smash hit it became.

On June 3, 2016, Derulo performed the song at the Opening Ceremony of the Copa América Centenario at Levi's Stadium in Santa Clara, California.

Music composition
The song is written and recorded in E♭ Major, running at 112-116 beats per minute. It has a main chord progression of E♭-Cm.

Critical reception
Time named "Want to Want Me" the third-best song of 2015.

Commercial performance
"Want to Want Me" debuted at number 45 on the Billboard Hot 100 chart on March 28, 2015. It jumped to number ten on the week of May 9, 2015, before reaching number five dated June 20.

Music video
The song's accompanying music video was directed by Colin Tilley. It premiered on Tinder on March 23, 2015.  The video features glamour model Tianna Gregory as Derulo's love interest in the video.

Track listing
Digital download
"Want to Want Me" – 3:27

Digital download – Westfunk remix
"Want to Want Me"  – 3:13

Other Versions
7th Heaven Radio Edit – 3:27

Credits and personnel
Credits adapted from Tidal and the liner notes of Everything Is 4.

Sam Martin – Backing Vocals
Nate Merchant – Engineer
Chris Gehringer – Mastering Engineer
John Hanes – Mixing Engineer
Serban Ghenea – Mixing Engineer
Frank Ramirez – Recording Engineer
JP Negrete – Recording Engineer

Charts

Weekly charts

Year-end charts

Certifications and sales

References

2015 songs
2015 singles
American synth-pop songs
Jason Derulo songs
UK Singles Chart number-one singles
Songs written by Ian Kirkpatrick (record producer)
Songs written by Sam Martin (singer)
Songs written by Lindy Robbins
Number-one singles in Austria
Number-one singles in Israel
Number-one singles in Scotland
South African Airplay Chart number-one singles
Music videos directed by Colin Tilley
Songs written by Mitch Allan
Songs written by Jason Derulo
Warner Records singles